The Harvest Jazz & Blues Festival is an annual music festival held each September in downtown Fredericton, New Brunswick, that features blues, jazz and world music.

The first festival in 1991 was held over four days in various existing venues around the downtown, including the inside of the Boyce Farmer's Market. In 2000, part of Queen Street was closed to traffic during the festival, a practice continued to the present day. Today, the festival includes dozens of acts spread out over 6 days. Venues include four dedicated tents, five outdoor "FreeHarvest" venues and 11 official pubs and clubs. It is the largest music event in the city.

See also

List of blues festivals
List of folk festivals
List of jazz festivals

References

External links
Harvest Jazz & Blues Festival official website

Music festivals established in 1991
Music festivals in Fredericton
Jazz festivals in Canada
Blues festivals in Canada
Folk festivals in Canada
World music festivals in Canada
1991 establishments in New Brunswick